Old St. Anthony's Catholic Church (Violet Museum) is a historic church at S. Violet Rd. and TX 44 in Violet, Texas.

It was built in 1910 and added to the National Register in 1979.

See also

National Register of Historic Places listings in Nueces County, Texas
Recorded Texas Historic Landmarks in Nueces County

References

External links

Roman Catholic churches in Texas
Churches on the National Register of Historic Places in Texas
Roman Catholic churches completed in 1910
Buildings and structures in Nueces County, Texas
National Register of Historic Places in Nueces County, Texas
Recorded Texas Historic Landmarks
20th-century Roman Catholic church buildings in the United States